Syunbetsu Dam  is a gravity dam located in Hokkaido Prefecture in Japan. The dam is used for power production. The catchment area of the dam is 469.4 km2. The dam impounds about 17  ha of land when full and can store 1430 thousand cubic meters of water. The construction of the dam was started on 1960 and completed in 1963.

References

Dams in Hokkaido